This is the list of United Kingdom MPs by seniority, 2010–2015.  The Members of Parliament (MPs) are ranked by the beginning of their terms in office, in the House of Commons.

The constituencies and party affiliations listed reflect those during the 55th Parliament. Seats and party affiliations for other Parliaments will be different for certain members.

The House of Commons of the 55th Parliament was elected on 6 May 2010 and first met on 18 May 2010. Under the  Fixed-term Parliaments Act 2011 (as amended) the next general election was on 7 May 2015 (although an early election or one delayed by up to two months would have been possible in certain circumstances). The formal dissolution of this Parliament took place on 30 March 2015.

This article describes the criteria for seniority in the House of Commons, as set out in Factsheet M3 (The Father of the House) issued by the House of Commons Information Office and revised in June 2010.

Seniority criteria
The criteria for seniority, used in this article, are derived from the way that the Father of the House is selected. They are not laid down in Standing Orders but arise from the customary practice of the House of Commons.

The modern custom is that the Father of the House is the MP who has the longest continuous service. If two or more members were first elected in the same General Election (or at by-elections held on the same day), then priority is given to the one who was sworn in first. The order of swearing in is recorded in Hansard, the official record of proceedings.

When a member has had broken service, that does not affect his or her seniority (for the purpose of qualifying as the Father of the House) which is based on the latest period of continuous service.

The Sinn Féin members, who abstain from taking their seats at Westminster, have never been sworn in. They are ranked (in this list) after all other members who have taken their seats. Between themselves they are ranked by the first date of election, for the current period of continuous service. If that criterion is equal, then they are ranked by alphabetical order of surnames.

In the House of Commons, the sole mandatory duty of the Father of the House is to preside over the election of a new Speaker whenever that office becomes vacant. The relevant Standing Order does not refer to this member by the title "Father of the House", referring instead to the longest-serving member of the House present who is not a Minister of the Crown (meaning that if the Father is absent or a government minister, the next person in line presides).

Summary of members elected by party

Notes
See here for a full list of changes during the fifty-fifth Parliament.
The actual government majority is calculated as Conservative and Liberal Democrat MPs less all other parties. This calculation excludes the Speaker, Deputy Speakers (two Labour and one Conservative) and Sinn Féin.

List of Members of Parliament by seniority
This article assigns a numerical rank to each of the 650 members initially elected to the 55th Parliament. Other members, who were not the first person declared elected to a seat but who joined the House during the Parliament, are not assigned a number.

See also
List of MPs elected in the 2010 United Kingdom general election

References

External links
 Fathers of the House Retrieved 16 March 2015 
 Members 1979-2010 Retrieved 16 March 2015

2010 United Kingdom general election
2010
Seniority